These Hearts is an American post-hardcore band from Fargo, North Dakota. The band started making music in 2007, and they disbanded in late 2013. The band released two full-length studio albums on Victory Records. Forever Ended Yesterday, was released in 2011, Yours to Take, was released in 2013 by the aforementioned label. This album was their breakthrough release upon the Billboard charts. In 2022, the band announced a reunion

Music history 

The band commenced as a musical entity in 2007, with their first release, Mistakes and Second Takes, an extended play, that was released on September 16, 2008, independently. They released, Forever Ended Yesterday, a studio album, on June 21, 2011, from Victory Records. Their subsequent studio album, Yours to Take, was released by Victory Records, on July 19, 2013. This album was the groups breakthrough release upon the Billboard charts, where it peaked at No. 36 on the Christian Albums chart, while it peaked at No. 33 on the Heatseekers Albums chart.

In 2022, a reunion tour was announced. Among multiple headline dates were shows including I Set My Friends On Fire, Sink In, and Across The White Water Tower.

Members 

Final Lineup
 Ryan Saunders – lead vocals (2007–2013)
 Kyle Colby – lead guitar, backing vocals (2009–2013)
 Daryl Van Beek – guitar (2007–2013)
 Tyler Rice – bass (2011–2013)
 Isaiah Folk – drums (2007–2013)

Past members
 Skyler Patzer – bass (2007–2010)
 Greg Gentzkow – bass (2010)
 Tom Westerholm – guitar (2008)

Discography
Studio albums
 Forever Ended Yesterday (June 21, 2011, Victory)
 Yours to Take (July 9, 2013, Victory)

EPs
 Mistakes and Second Takes (September 16, 2008, Independently)

References

External links
Official website

Musical groups established in 2007
Musical groups disestablished in 2014
Victory Records artists